Project 985 was a terminated project that was first announced by General Secretary of the Chinese Communist Party Jiang Zemin at the 100th anniversary of Peking University on May 4, 1998, to promote the development and reputation of the Chinese higher education system by founding world-class universities in the 21st century. The name derives from the date of the announcement, May 1998, or 98/5 according to the Chinese date format. The project involves both national and local governments allocating large amounts of funding to certain universities in order to build new research centers, improve facilities, hold international conferences, attract world-renowned faculty and visiting scholars, and help Chinese faculty attend conferences abroad.

History 
On May 4, 1998, a project that was first announced by General Secretary of the Chinese Communist Party Jiang Zemin at the 100th anniversary of Peking University to promote the development and reputation of the Chinese higher education system by founding world-class universities in the 21st century.

In 2006, another 33 universities were selected from universities that had not been included in Project 985. The 33 selected universities were jointly sponsored by the Ministry of Education and the Ministry of Finance of the People's Republic of China to support their developments in certain scientific or engineering subjects to meet the urgent need of the state. These 33 universities together were included in a sub-project of Project 985, called the "985 Project Innovation Platform Project".

In 2009, the original nine founding member universities of Project 985 formed the C9 League. By the end of the second phase of the project, 39 universities were sponsored. It was announced in 2011 that the project had closed, and no new schools would be able to join.

In 2014, some universities of Project 985 claimed that the project funding had been stopped in 2013.

In October 2015, the State Council of P.R.China published the 'Overall Plan for Promoting the Construction of World First-Class Universities and First-Class Disciplines (Double First Class University Plan)' and made new arrangements for the development of higher education in China.

In 2016, the Ministry of Education of China confirmed that Project 985 had been abolished and replaced by the Double First Class University Plan.

In September 2017, a related plan started in 2015 called the Double First Class University Plan was formally announced; 140 universities were included in this plan, representing a reshuffle in the rankings of China's most prestigious universities.

In 2019, the Ministry of Education of China reconfirmed that the Project 985 had been repealed and replaced by the Double First-Class University Plan.

Admissions 
The Project 985 universities were elite academic institutions that admit students through an extremely competitive process of the National Higher Education Entrance Examination ("Gaokao") for undergraduate programs.

Rankings and reputation 
Project 985 members were classified as doctoral universities with very high research activities among all Chinese universities, regarded as the tier 1 universities out of more than 3,000 higher education institutions in China, and viewed as some of the most prestigious universities of all Chinese universities and consistently ranked among the best in the world, while some Project 985 universities were added into the project for 'aid the poor' and 'nationality policies' reasons. As of 2022, 32 universities in the former Project 985 ranked in the top 300, including 24 top 200 universities and 8 top 100 universities according to the Academic Ranking of World Universities. As of 2022, 33 universities were ranked in the top 500 by the AppliedHE Rankometer, a composite ranking system combing five of the world's most influential university rankings, namely, ARWU, QS, THE, CWTS Leiden Ranking, and Webometrics Ranking. In the Nature Index Annual Table 2022, which evaluated the largest collections of articles published in 82 of the world's leading high-quality scientific journals, 30 universities in the former Project 985 ranked in the global top 200, including 23 in the top 100, 13 in the top 50, and 8 in the top 20.

Project 985 universities have been compared to other elite university projects or groupings worldwide, such as UK Russell Group universities, Association of American Universities' sixty members, Canada's U15, and German Universities Excellence Initiative. Former Project 985 universities as a grouping have been rapidly catching up with other elite groupings in terms of global rankings.

List of sponsored universities
39 Project 985 universities were sponsored by the Ministry of Education. All the universities of the former Project 985 are members of several categories of national key universities and the current Double First Class University Plan, representing China's most prestigious universities. 

Note: C9 represents the university included in the C9 League.

See also

Double First Class University Plan, a scheme for improving 147 of China's top universities
C9 League, a formal group of 9 elite universities in China
 Project 211, a terminated program for developing 110 comprehensive universities in China
 Excellence League, an alliance of leading Chinese universities with strong backgrounds in engineering
 Big Four Institutes of Technology
 Yangtze Delta Universities Alliance
State Key Laboratories
Plan 111
863 Program
List of universities in China
Rankings of universities in China
Small-town Swot

References

 
985
Higher education in China
Universities and colleges in China
College and university associations and consortia in Asia
China Projects